Hewson Cox House is a historic home located in West Whiteland Township, Chester County, Pennsylvania. The house was built in 1854, and is a two-story, three bay, cross-shaped stuccoed stone dwelling in the Rural Gothic-Cottage style. It has a steeply pitched four-gable roof and features a central projecting bay with Tudor-arched openings.  It has a -story rear kitchen ell.  It was renovated in 1904.

It was listed on the National Register of Historic Places in 1984.

References

Houses on the National Register of Historic Places in Pennsylvania
Gothic Revival architecture in Pennsylvania
Houses completed in 1854
Houses in Chester County, Pennsylvania
National Register of Historic Places in Chester County, Pennsylvania